Ying may refer to:

People
 Yíng (嬴), a Chinese surname, the ancestral name of Qin Shi Huang, first Emperor of China in the Qin Dynasty, and some contemporary rival royal families such as the Zhaos
 Yīng (应), a Chinese surname from the Zhou Dynasty
 Xing (surname) (邢), also spelled Ying based on its Cantonese pronunciation

Places
 Ying (state) (應國), feudal state in Henan during the Zhou dynasty
 Ying River (颖河), in Dengfeng, Henan Province, China
 Ying (Chu) (郢), capital of the ancient State of Chu
 Ying County (應縣), in Shuozhou, Shanxi Province, China

Other uses
 Ying Quartet, a string quartet

See also
 Yin and yang, often misspelled Ying
 Yingzhou (disambiguation)
 Prince Ying (disambiguation)